The first inauguration of Grover Cleveland as the 22nd president of the United States took place on Wednesday, March 4, 1885, at the East Portico of the United States Capitol in Washington, D.C. This was the 25th inauguration and marked the commencement of the first four-year term of Grover Cleveland as president and the only term of Thomas A. Hendricks as vice president. Hendricks died  days into this term, and the office remained vacant since there was no constitutional provision which allow an intra-term vice-presidential office filling; it would be regulated by the Twenty-fifth Amendment in 1967.

Chief Justice Morrison Waite administered the presidential oath of office, and Cleveland held a Bible given to him at age 15 by his mother as he recited it. Cleveland's second inauguration took place eight years after the first, as his two terms in office were not consecutive. He is the only U.S. president to serve non-consecutive terms.

See also
First Presidency of Grover Cleveland
Second inauguration of Grover Cleveland
1884 United States presidential election

References

External links

 Text of Cleveland's First Inaugural Address

United States presidential inaugurations
1885 in Washington, D.C.
1885 in American politics
Inauguration
March 1885 events